Panagiotis Dounis (born 23 March 1997) is a Greek professional footballer who plays as a goalkeeper for Panthiraikos FC.

Club career
Panagiotis Dounis promoted to AEK Athens senior squad in 2013. He played 4 times in the semi-pro Football League 2. On 31 August 2016 he was loaned to Kallithea. He started the season as the team's first goalkeeper, but at the end of the season he was limited to just 5 appearances to the league and 3 to the Greek Cup.

In January 2019, he went on a trial at Doxa Drama, but did not receive a contract. He ended up signing with AE Lefkimmi instead on 26 January 2019. In the summer 2019, he then joined Panthiraikos.

International career
Dounis is a regular member of Greece U-18 since 2014.

Honours
AEK Athens
Superleague: 2017–18
Football League: 2014–15 (South Group)
Football League 2: 2013–14 (6th Group)
Greek Cup: 2015–16

References

External links
 

1997 births
Living people
Association football goalkeepers
AEK Athens F.C. players
Kallithea F.C. players
Panegialios F.C. players
Footballers from Athens
Greek footballers